Shakha Proshakha is a 1990  film directed by Satyajit Ray. It deals with four generations of a well-to-do Bengali family, with a focus on the third generation. This film displays an extraordinary use of legendary orchestras of Bach and Beethoven.

Plot 
Anandamohan Majumdar, a wealthy, retired industrialist, lives with his 93-year-old father Abhay Charan, and his second son Proshanto. Proshanto, who was once a promising mineralogist, was rendered mentally ill because of a motor accident in England after which he had to leave his job in a few months after he had returned to India, and now spends his time listening to music. However, his memories are still intact though they remain buried in him and only occasionally emerge in his mind, the reason being his mental instability. On the other hand, Abhay Charan used to be a successful English teacher in a school of Hazaribagh (from where Ananda passed out), but with age had slowly forgotten about past events and now lives the life of a senile man, being in the constant care of Ramdohin, one of the family servants.

On his 70th birthday, Ananda suddenly falls ill during a ceremony in his honor. His other three sons who live away rush immediately to his bedside.

The eldest son Probodh is a high-ranking officer in a company and the third son Probir is a businessman. They live corrupt lives and do not want their father, an uncompromising moralist who believes in work and honesty, to find out. It is also revealed that they are indifferent towards their grandfather Abhay Charan, due to their intolerance towards senility. The youngest of the four, Protap, weary of office life and corruption, has left his job and joins a professional theatre company to be away from corruption. During the family meals, tensions are accentuated. Dingo, Probir's only son, learns about the corrupt ways of his father and uncle. Waiting for resolution of their father's health crisis, the four brothers and their families reminisce and relive ideological differences.

One day, all of them except Proshanto go for a picnic. There Protap informs everyone that he left his job as he was not able to tolerate the corrupt practices of the officers. On the last day, Dingo goes to see his grandfather and unknowingly reveals to him about the dishonesty of his father and eldest uncle. This conversation is also heard by Proshanto. Then the families, unaware that their father now know about their corrupt ways, came to bid goodbye to Ananda. After their departure, Ananda feels heartbroken knowing that two of his children are dishonest. Proshanto comes to meet his father and his father reveals to him that he is now everything to him.

Cast

List of characters

Anandamohan Majumdar

He is the 70-year-old retired General Manager of the Orient Mica Works. Aside from being an experienced veteran in the industrial world, Anandamohan is a philanthropist with a golden heart, whose involvement in social work and honest conduct has earned him praise and respect from the society; even the township he helped develop, has been named Anandanagar in his honor. Having raised four sons, he has high hopes that they would also uphold to the ideals of honesty and hard work which he himself has held to ever since the early days of his career.

Probodh Majumdar

Anandamohan's eldest son. A high-ranking officer of a well-known company, Probodh went to study abroad in the past (followed by his younger brother Proshanto), and became a successful man, eventually getting married and raising a daughter. Despite being a gentleman with a proper conduct and having great respect for his father, Probodh secretly leads a corrupt lifestyle, a fact which the rest of the family (except Anandamohan) is aware about. He states that despite the fact that his father's ideals are honorable, they can't help people survive the present world. Despite his corrupt ways and his apparent intolerance towards his grandfather Abhay Charan's senility, Probodh does care for his family very much, especially his wife Uma, who seems to understand her husband's circumstances.

Proshanto Majumdar

Anandamohan's second son. A promising mineralogist in the past, Proshanto went abroad (to England) for higher studies besides his older brother Probodh, but was rendered mentally ill after a motor accident. He eventually gave up his profession a few months after his return to India due to his condition, and continued to stay with his father, his now-deceased mother, and grandfather for the rest of his life; he is the only son who permanently lives with his father. Being mostly quiet and sometimes unresponsive while interacting with others, and spending his days enjoying Western music, Proshanto has great resentment towards people with secure employment, especially including his own brothers Probodh and Probir due to their increasingly corrupt lifestyles. A firm believer in his father's ideals, he finds common ground with his youngest brother Protap, who hates corrupt practices with a somewhat rebellious passion.

Probir Majumdar

Anandamohan's third son. A wealthy businessman, Probir holds deep resentment towards his father, due to being not given the opportunity to study abroad like Probodh and Proshanto, and enough resources and support to help him gain success in his life due to being poor in academics. This resentment ultimately drives Probir to work hard to match with his father's expectations, eventually becoming successful. However, Probir eventually started indulging in corrupt practices; he also became a habitual gambler. He doesn't have good relations with his wife Tapti because of his lifestyle, the marriage still standing only because of their son, Dingo, still being there in their lives. Probir shows great intolerance towards his grandfather's senility and Proshanto's mental illness. Despite both being corrupt individuals, he doesn't seem to get along with Probodh, and secretly wishes for his father to be dead because of how he was treated unfairly in the past, even hoping to get hold of his share of the family property once Anandamohan dies.

Protap Majumdar

Anandamohan's youngest son. Unlike Probodh and Probir, Protap has great respect for his father's ideals, and has intense hatred towards corruption. Previously a hard-working employee at a well-known corporate company, he resigns from his job when he learns that his boss, whom he looked up to as a mentor and older brother-figure, has become involved into corrupt practices. He later joins a theatrical company, knowing that the world of theater has a much lesser involvement in corruption than the corporate world. He is sympathetic towards Proshanto's condition, and shares a common ground with him due to the fact that both have great respect for their father's beliefs. He also has friendly relations with his sister-in-law Tapti, sympathizing with her plight of being in a troubled marriage with Probir. Protap has a stoic personality, despite his hidden rebellious streak, and although he loves and respects all his brothers, he isn't happy with Probodh and Probir's increasingly corrupt practices. He is also a chain smoker, having developed the habit due to having insomnia.

Uma Majumdar

Probodh's wife. Uma is shown to be a dutiful wife, and also the responsible eldest daughter-in-law of the family. Despite being sad about her husband's involvement in corruption, she still loves and cares about him, as Probodh has always remained faithful and trustworthy to her.

Tapti Majumdar

Probir's wife. Tapti is shown to have a troubled relationship with her husband because of his increasingly corrupt lifestyle, which includes his habitual gambling and womanizing tendencies. The reason their marriage still stands is their young son Dingo. A well-educated woman, Tapti is well aware that Probir never married her out of real love, but rather for her beauty. She is friendly with her brother-in-law Protap, due to him being a much better person than Probir.

Dipayan "Dingo" Majumdar

Probir and Tapti's 5-year-old son and Anandamohan's grandson. Dingo is the real reason Probir and Tapti's marriage still stands. Due to being just a kid, Dingo has little understanding about how the world works, but is still shown to be a keen observer. He eventually learns about his father and eldest uncle's corrupt lifestyles, and later unknowingly becomes the one to reveal this disturbing detail to his grandfather.

Abhay Charan Majumdar

Anandamohan's 93-year-old father; Probodh, Proshanto, Probir and Protap's grandfather; Dingo's great-grandfather. In the past, Abhay Charan used to be a successful English teacher at a school in Hazaribagh (from where his son graduated), but with age has forgotten most of the details of his past and now lives the life of a senile man. He is shown to remain under the constant care of Ramdohin, one of the family servants, and often acts like a child and observes his surroundings with great curiosity. Both Probodh and Probir are shown not being able to stand their grandfather's senility.

Other credits

References

External links 
satyajitray.org on the film
"Satyajit Ray Film and Study Collection", UCSC
 

1990 films
Films directed by Satyajit Ray
Bengali-language Indian films
Films with screenplays by Satyajit Ray
1990s Bengali-language films